Kayyara Kinhanna Rai  (8 June 1915 – 9 August 2015) was an Indian independence activist, author, poet, journalist, teacher and farmer.

Early life
Rai was born on 8 June 1915 to Duggappa and Deyyakka Rai in a Tulu-speaking Bunt family. His given name is unique since it includes the Kannada alphabet 'ಞ' (a palatal consonant pronounced nasally as "nya"), which is used very rarely in the written Kannada of today and is absent in the English alphabet which often leads to various other transliterations of his given name such as Kinyanna and Kinnanna. Rai first learned Kannada in school. Later he published his first handwritten journal, Susheela, at the age of 12. He was influenced by Mahatma Gandhi and also participated in the freedom movement of India. During this period he married Unyakka and is a father to eight children.

Career
Rai started his career as a secondary school teacher. He also delved into journalism and contributed his writings to newspapers like Swabhimana, Madras Mail and The Hindu. He received the National Award for Best Teacher in 1969. He is a writer and poet who has written books on theatre, grammar and children. Some of his famous poems are Shreemukha, Aikyagana, Punarnava, Chethana and Koraga. He has written a biography of Govinda Pai, the Kannada poet from whom he was highly influenced. His other important works are Malayala Sahitya Charithre (History of Malayalam literature),which is a translation of an original work by P. K.  Parameshwaran Nair and Sahithya Drushti. He was conferred an honorary doctorate by Mangalore University in 2005. He also chaired the 66th Akhila Kannada Sahitya Sammelana (Kannada Literature Conference), which was held at Mangalore. Some of his poems have been used as songs for the Kannada film, Paduvaaralli Pandavaru which was directed by Puttanna Kanagal. In 1980 he also stood for elections in Kasargod to the Kerala Legislative Assembly but was unsuccessful.

Rai was also an avid agriculturist and was active in the cultivation of areca, rubber and rice.

Later life
Rai was a campaigner for the merger of Kasaragod district into Karnataka. One of his main goals was to seek the implementation of the Mahajan Committee Report, which urged the inclusion of the northern part of Kasaragod district (to the north of the Chandragiri river) into Karnataka. He founded the Kasargod Merger Action Council (Kasaragod Vileeneekarana Kriya Samithi) in 2002 to work towards this goal. Describing the goals of this council Rai said that the linguistic minorities in the district were not against the Malayalis or Kerala State, per se, but were demanding the implementation of the Justice Mahajan Commission report, vis-a-vis the fulfilment of promises made by the former Chief Ministers, E. M. S. Namboodiripad, C. Achutha Menon and Pattam Thanu Pillai, in this regard.

Rai had a natural death from old age at his residence at Kallakalia near Badiyadka, Kasaragod, Kerala at the age of 100.

Awards
Some of the awards and honours that Rai has received include:
 Karnataka Sahitya Academy award – 1969
 National Award for Best Teacher – 1969
 Honorary Fellowship by Manipal Academy of Higher Education (1970).
 President – 67th Akhila Bharatha Kannada Sahitya Sammelana held in Mangalore in 1998
 Pejawar Award in literature – 2004
 Alva's Nudisri Award – 2005
 Adarsha Ratna Award – 2006
 Nadoja (Teacher of the State) Award – 2006
 Karnataka Ekikarana (Unification) Award – 2007
 Honorary Fellowship by the Kannada Sahitya Parishat – 2009
 1st Karnataka Gadinada Ratna Award
 Pampa award

Quotes
 "Benki biddide namma manege ... O bega banni, Kannadada gadi kayona banni, Kannadada nudi kaypona banni" – ("Our house is on fire ... Oh come fast, let's safeguard the boundaries of Kannada, let's save the Kannada language")
 "Language and culture transcend geographical barriers and people who want to disseminate culture and language are not bound by borders."
 "It is meaningless for the Karnataka Government to observe Suvarna Karnataka [the Golden Jubilee of the formation of the state of Karnataka] if the problems faced by the State are not solved."

References

External links

 An interview recorded with Kayyar Kinhanna Rai  by Sampada on 13 January 2010.
 Hannu maaruvavana haadu (Nanjanagudina Rasabaale) – Famous Kannada poem by Kayyar Kinhanna Rai.
 Karavaliya Mahakavi Kayyara – a writeup on Kayyara.

1915 births
2015 deaths
Indian centenarians
Kannada-language writers
Kannada poets
Indian independence activists from Kerala
Mangaloreans
Tulu people
Journalists from Kerala
People from Kasaragod district
20th-century Indian poets
Malayalam-language writers
Indian male poets
Poets from Kerala
20th-century Indian male writers
Men centenarians